The Treaty of Pontotoc Creek was a treaty signed on October 20, 1832 by representatives of the United States and the Chiefs of the Chickasaw Nation assembled at the National Council House on Pontotoc Creek in Pontotoc, Mississippi. The treaty ceded the 6,283,804 million acres of the remaining Chickasaw homeland in Mississippi in return for Chickasaw relocation on an equal amount of land west of the Mississippi River.

The treaty followed an earlier agreement to move west of the Mississippi in 1830 which the Chickasaw refused to honor after discovering the poor nature of the land they received. Pressured by the aggression of the State of Mississippi to establish its jurisdiction over the Indians, Chickasaw Chiefs relented in 1832 to President Andrew Jackson's and his representatives offer of relocation in the west. The land was ceded to the U.S. with the understanding that the proceeds made in the sale of the land to white settlers would go to the Chickasaw. The treaty led to the Chickasaw Trail of Tears, by which the entire Chickasaw Nation emigrated to new territory in present-day Oklahoma in 1837-1838.

Background 
The treaty was part of the greater Indian Removal policy, originally proposed by President Thomas Jefferson, by which the Five Civilized Tribes were to allow for white settlement in the south by ceding their territory and relocating west of the Mississippi River. It was one of several removal treaties signed by the Muscogee, Choctaw, Chickasaw, and Cherokee in the 1830s relocating them to the new territories in present-day Oklahoma and Arkansas. The Chickasaw were essentially doomed to removal with the others, when, in 1806 Jefferson promised the southern states that the Federal Government would encourage the migration of all Indians to land west of the Mississippi. The other factor underlying the removal of the Indians was land speculation, one of the primary sources of money for the landed aristocracy of the South since the early days of the Virginia colony. The trio of Andrew Jackson, John Coffee and James Jackson (unrelated), were each land speculators, militiamen and politicians who worked the cessions of huge tracts of Indians lands, the defeat of Indian resistance and eventually the complete removal of the Chickasaw, as well as the rest of the Five Civilized Tribes, to make way for white settlers –often at great personal profit.

First attempts at removal: Treaties of 1805, 1816 and 1818 
A series of land cessions preceded this final cession of Chickasaw land at Pontotoc Creek. The Chickasaws made two significant cessions in 1805 and 1816, ceding their land in Alabama and Tennessee along the Tennessee River, the highly valued land along the Muscle Shoals rapids of the river. The cessions had made a great profit to Jackson, Coffee and James Jackson, the latter of whom built his magnificent Forks of Cypress Plantation on the ceded land in Florence, Alabama. In 1818 Jackson began his attempt to totally remove the Chickasaw in a treaty that ceded everything between the Tennessee River and the Mississippi. John C. Calhoun, President Monroe's Secretary of War, had told Jackson that  "The President is very anxious to remove the Indians on this side to the west of the Mississippi, and if the Chickasaws could be brought to an exchange of territory, it would be preferred."  This land was very valuable on account of its fertile land and salt licks, and the Chickasaw were aware of this value. Jackson persuaded James Colbert and other Chickasaw chiefs to meet him at the Chickasaw Old Town (now Tupelo, Mississippi) to talk about the proposed cession. The Chickasaw were greatly influenced by the powerful chiefs James, George and Levi Colbert, landholding Chickasaw who had adopted some of the trappings of plantation society like owning slaves, and who supported removal to the west. With great difficulty, Jackson finally got the Chickasaw chiefs to give in with the promise of $20,000 paid annually to the chiefs for fifteen years. A deed was drawn up in the name of James Jackson, revealing the corrupt nature of these cessions later pointed out by Andrew Jackson's adversaries, and the Chickasaw lost everything north of the Mississippi border with Tennessee. Andrew Jackson achieved a massive land cession but not the total western removal that was wanted. The Chickasaw carefully guarded their remaining land until Jackson became President.

Treaty of Pontotoc Creek, 1832 
After Jackson was elected President in 1828 he resolved to finish the drawn-out question of removal for good. The Indian Removal Act was passed in May, 1830, giving the President direct authority to negotiate the removal treaties for the Five Civilized Tribes still clinging to their southeastern homelands.

Treaty of Franklin, 1830 
After the act, Jackson received strong legal and judicial resistance from the more law-savvy Creeks and Cherokees, and the Choctaw Chief Greenwood LeFlore furiously refused any meeting with the president. However, the Chickasaw agreed to meet him in Franklin, Tennessee in the summer of 1830. By this point, the State of Mississippi had taken the same measures in dealing with the Chickasaw and Choctaw Indians as Georgia had with the Cherokee, essentially forbidding any exercise of tribal governance and extending state law over the Chickasaw Nation's borders. The Chickasaw came to Franklin to appeal to Jackson for Federal protection from Mississippi. Jackson, however, successfully talked the chiefs into removal after suggesting that by remaining in Mississippi, the Chickasaw would become subject to Mississippi law and their culture would eventually be extinguished by the incursion of white settlers. He said: "By becoming amalgamated with the whites, your national character will be lost... you must disappear and be forgotten." On August 27, 1830, after four days of deliberation, the Chickasaw chiefs agreed to exchange their land in Mississippi and relocate to the west.

Renegotiation and Pontotoc Creek 
A Chickasaw delegation assigned to explore the new Chickasaw territory west of the Mississippi stalled removal, much to Jackson's distress, for another two years. They returned to the Mississippi Chickasaw and said that the new land was unacceptable for their people. The Senate refused to ratify the Franklin treaty and the Chickasaw refused to leave their territory in Mississippi. For two additional years, the Chickasaws remained in Mississippi. Increasingly, however, the resolve of the Chickasaw people began to wane due to increasing numbers of non-Chickasaw squatters on Chickasaw lands and the passage of Mississippi state laws which challenged Chickasaw self-governance. In 1832, the Chickasaw National Council agreed to meet with John Coffee to negotiate a land transfer treaty. On October 20, 1832, during a meeting at the Council House on Pontotoc Creek, Chickasaw leaders signed a treaty allowing for the sale of Chickasaw lands within the state of Mississippi, in exchange for the surveying of new lands in the west. 

The preamble written by the Chickasaw chiefs read: 
The Chickasaw Nation find themselves oppressed in their present situation, by being made subject to the laws of the States in which they reside. Being ignorant of the laws of the white man, they cannot understand or obey them. Rather than submit to this great evil, they prefer to seek a home in the west, where they may live and be governed by their own laws. And believing that they can procure for themselves a home, in a country suited to their wants and condition, provided they had the means to contract and pay for the same, they have determined to sell their country and hunt a new home. The President has heard the complaints of the Chickasaws and like them believes they cannot be happy, and prosper as a nation, in their present situation and condition, and being desirous to relieve them from the great calamity that seems to await them, if they remain as they are - He has sent his Commissioner General John Coffee, who has met the whole Chickasaw nation in Council, and after mature deliberation, they have entered into the following articles...

Although further complications had to be resolved, Arrell M. Gibson writes that the Pontotoc Creek Treaty "was the basic Chickasaw removal document providing for the cession of all tribal land east of the Mississippi River." In the treaty, the Chickasaw land was ceded in return for the U.S. finding suitable land for resettlement –revealing the chiefs' desperation to regain Chickasaw sovereignty from the aggressions of the state of Mississippi. Chickasaw landholders were to be compensated for the improvements made on their lands, and all the proceeds made by the Federal government in the sale of the land were to be turned over to the Chickasaw to pay for finding new territory and the actual removal of the tribe. Unlike in other removal treaties, the Chickasaw would pay for their own migration. The treaty also provided for protection the Chickasaw in Mississippi until they emigrated with the allotment of "temporary homesteads." This meant that the Chickasaws were allotted the land they were living on in Mississippi, to be protected by the Federal government from squatters; this benefit was not given to the Cherokee when later the Federal government relied on the influx of squatters in Georgia to pressure the Cherokee into removal.

Aftermath 

Immediately following the treaty, unallotted Chickasaw land was quickly occupied by white settlers, although they were not supposed to enter, under the treaty, until the Chickasaw relocated. 

Between 1832 and 1837, the Chickasaw made several further negotiations, in part because of the reluctance of the Senate to confirm Pontotoc and in part because of the Chickasaws' dissatisfaction with finding new land. The Treaty of Washington in 1834 confirmed Pontotoc. In addition it allowed for the enlargement of the Chickasaw temporary homesteads to be sold, and guaranteed the right of the Chickasaw to receive the revenue for each improved homestead sold. The chiefs were concerned to make the best deal in terms of sale and of acquiring new land for the Chickasaw people.

Land in the West, Treaty of Doaksville 1837 
After Pontotoc, Chickasaw sent delegations to search for the new land in the Arkansas Territory, reaching an agreement with the Choctaw in 1837. The Chickasaw decided to buy a part of the Choctaw tribe's new western land under what became known as the Treaty of Doaksville for $530,000. Although the treaty was really between the two Indian nations, Andrew Jackson persuaded  the Senate to ratify the treaty. Essentially, the Chickasaw had ceded their eastern land with the Treaty of Pontotoc Creek and acquired western land from the Choctaw in the Treaty of Doaksville.

Result: Chickasaw Trail of Tears 
In 1837-38, with their western lands having been purchased from the Choctaw, 4,914 Chickasaws and their 1,156 slaves emigrated to the new, western Chickasaw Nation. They received over $3 million from the sales of the Mississippi allotments, but with this wealth incurred further external threats from white opportunists coming to the new Chickasaw territory as surveyors and salesmen. The Chickasaw trail of tears was the least traumatic of the removal journeys of any of the Five Civilized Tribes. It was achieved with relative success compared to the Choctaw or Cherokee, yet it still had damaging effects on tribal culture and structure which took decades to heal.

References 

United States and Native American treaties
Native American history of Mississippi
Chickasaw
Trail of Tears
Muskogean tribes
1832 treaties
1830s in the United States